Disparsine is a genus of erebid moths, established by Volynkin in 2019. Species in the genus were previously classified in the genus Barsine.

Species 

 Disparsine crustata (Talbot, 1926)
 Disparsine nigrocincta (Snellen, 1879)

References 

Moth genera
Nudariina
Moths described in 2019